ŠK Slovan Bratislava Ženy is a women's football team in the Slovak Women's First League, representing ŠK Slovan Bratislava. It has won the league 15 times, including the two last ones as of 2021.

Slovan have also won the women's League–Cup double in the seasons 2009, 2011, 2012 and 2018.

Honours
 Slovak Women's First League
 Champions (14): 1995 to 1999, 2001, 2004, 2009 to 2012, 2016, 2018, 2019
 Slovak Women's Cup 
 Winners (6): 2009, 2011, 2012, 2013, 2018, 2022
 Runners-up (6): 2010, 2014, 2015, 2016, 2017, 2019

Record in UEFA competitions

Current squad
Slovan women's squad:

References

Women's football clubs in Slovakia
Football clubs in Bratislava
ŠK Slovan Bratislava